The Mackey–Arens theorem is an important theorem in functional analysis that characterizes those locally convex vector topologies that have some given space of linear functionals as their continuous dual space. 
According to Narici (2011), this profound result is central to duality theory; a theory that is "the central part of the modern theory of topological vector spaces."

Prerequisites

The answer to this question is called the Mackey–Arens theorem.

Mackey–Arens theorem

See also

 Dual system
 Mackey topology
 Polar topology

References

Sources

 
 
 
 

Functional analysis
Lemmas
Topological vector spaces
Linear functionals